Max Thompson (born 9 February 2002) is an English professional footballer who plays as a forward for Sunderland.

Career

Youth career
Thompson was first spotted playing by Everton head of recruitment, Martin Waldron, in a local tournament at around aged six or seven and instantly impressed. Waldron wanted to bring him to the Academy setup at Everton and was involved in a few games but he ended up signing for Manchester United as an under-9. He progressed through the age groups at United, but surprisingly wasn't offered a scholarship and departed the club aged 15. Waldron and Everton had kept a close eye on Thompson whenever the two sides met and naturally he moved to Everton following his release. He spent 18-months at the club, but finding game time at Everton limited, Thompson was allowed to explore other options and he requested to be released from his contract. Burnley were not openly looking to add a striker but offered Thompson a trial. The forward scored twice in an under-23 friendly and played once for the under-18 side against Nottingham Forest. He made the right impression and Burnley effectively took over his scholarship in December 2019, signing for 18-months.

Professional career
During the COVID-19 pandemic lockdown, Thompson was invited to train with the first-team bubble and impressed manager, Sean Dyche, in training. On 22 June 2020, he made his senior debut, coming on as a substitute for Matěj Vydra in Burnley's 5–0 loss to Manchester City at the City of Manchester Stadium.

On 22 July 2022, Thompson joined newly-promoted Championship side Sunderland on a two-year deal for an undisclosed fee. He was initially assigned to the under-21 squad.

Personal life
Thompson’s brother and father, Warren, also played football, for Blackburn Rovers and York City respectively.

Career statistics

References

2002 births
Living people
English footballers
Association football forwards
Manchester United F.C. players
Everton F.C. players
Burnley F.C. players
Premier League players
Sunderland A.F.C. players